Revda may refer to:
Revda, Sverdlovsk Oblast, a town in Sverdlovsk Oblast, Russia
Revda, Murmansk Oblast, an urban-type settlement in Murmansk Oblast, Russia
Revda (river), a tributary of the Chusovaya in Sverdlovsk Oblast, Russia